A Place on the Shelf, a play off their third album's title A Place in the Queue, is a 2009 compilation album of songs not finished or released on studio albums, many of them in demo form. The initial release through the band's website featured three bonus tracks on the CD. It was later released as a 5-song album on Andy Tillison's Bandcamp page.

"Le Massacre du Printemps" is Tillison's version of the Igor Stravinsky piece The Rite Of Spring. "Everyman's Forgotten Monday" was originally on the album "Lifecycle" by Gold Frankincense & Diskdrive. "I Wanna Be A Chick" was originally recorded in 2008 for Down and Out in Paris and London. Originally written for release on Not as Good as the Book, the controversial epic "Live On Air" is based on the events of the 7 July 2005 London bombings.

Track listing

Personnel 
Andy Tillison – keyboards, electric guitar, and vocals
Jonathan Barrett – bass guitar
Paul Burgess – drums
Theo Travis – saxophone and flute
Guy Manning – acoustic guitar and vocals

References 

2009 compilation albums
The Tangent albums